Kevin DeVon Knox (born January 30, 1971) is a former American football wide receiver. Selected in the sixth round of the 1994 NFL Draft, he played one season with the Arizona Cardinals. He played college football at Florida State, winning a national championship in 1993.

Knox's son, Kevin Knox II is a professional basketball player who was picked by the New York Knicks with the 9th overall pick in the 2018 NBA draft.

References 

1971 births
Living people
American football wide receivers
Arizona Cardinals players
Florida State Seminoles football players
People from Niceville, Florida
Players of American football from Florida